Terong (Jawi: تروڠ) is a mukim in Larut, Matang and Selama District, Perak, Malaysia. It is famous for the quality of its water and the presence of a waterfall. Tin was also mined there until 1980. It had Malay, Chinese and Tamil primary schools but the numbers have dwindled considerably.

The village is surrounded by plantations of rubber and palm oil trees. Many quaint shops exist in the village centre.

Larut, Matang and Selama District
Mukims of Perak